Noh Soo-Jin (born on February 10, 1962) is a former South Korea football player.

He was a part of the South Korea national football team who of the FIFA World Cup in 1986, 1990. Also he was a member of 1988 Summer Olympics and 1988 AFC Asian Cup. 

At the club side, he won the K-League 1989 with Yukong Elephants.

He is currently manager of Yeongdeungpo Technical High School FC.

Club career statistics

Honours
National team
 1986 Asian Games Winners: 1986

Club
Yukong Elephants
 K-League Winners: 1989

Individual
 K-League MVP: 1989
 K-League Best XI: 1987, 1989

International goals
Results list South Korea's goal tally first.

References

 Legends of K-League : 노수진

External links
 
 
 

1962 births
Living people
Association football midfielders
South Korean footballers
South Korea international footballers
Jeju United FC players
K League 1 players
K League 1 Most Valuable Player Award winners
1986 FIFA World Cup players
1988 AFC Asian Cup players
1990 FIFA World Cup players
Footballers at the 1988 Summer Olympics
Olympic footballers of South Korea
Asian Games medalists in football
Footballers at the 1986 Asian Games

Asian Games gold medalists for South Korea
Medalists at the 1986 Asian Games